Andrew John McKay (born 17 April 1980) is a former New Zealand cricketer who played for the Wellington Firebirds in the State Championship, having moved from the Auckland Aces for the 2009–10 season. He was born in Auckland.

In June 2015 McKay announced his retirement from all forms of cricket.

International career
Mckay made his One Day International (ODI) debut at Napier for New Zealand, against Bangladesh, on 5 February 2010.

Mckay made his international Test debut in what was to be his only test at Nagpur for New Zealand, against India, on 20 November 2010 and took the prize wicket of The Master - Sachin Tendulkar as his 1st International Test wicket.

See also
 One-Test wonder

References

1980 births
Living people
New Zealand cricketers
New Zealand Test cricketers
New Zealand One Day International cricketers
New Zealand Twenty20 International cricketers
Auckland cricketers
Wellington cricketers
Cricketers at the 2011 Cricket World Cup